SeaChange is an Australian drama television series, created by Andrew Knight and Debroah Cox, and produced by Artist Services for ABC TV during its initial run from 1998 to 2000, and subsequently, by ITV Studios Australia and Every Cloud Productions in 2019 for its revival, broadcast on Nine Network. The series stars Sigrid Thornton as Laura Gibson, a highly-successful city lawyer; following a set of tragic circumstances, she relocates to the coastal town of Pearl Bay, where she once spent a family holiday, and on a whim, takes the job as a magistrate.

Series overview

Season 1 (1998)

Season 2 (1999)

Season 3 (2000)

Season 4 (2019)

External links
Episode guide at the SeaChange official website

References

Lists of Australian drama television series episodes
SeaChange